OGUsers (OGU) is an internet forum that facilitates the discussion and hacking of social media accounts and online usernames. Established in 2017, the website is dedicated to the buying and selling of "rare" or "OG" online accounts that are considered valuable due to their name or age. The website acts as a platform for cybercrime and the harassment of individuals for access to their online accounts. Several high-profile incidents have been linked to the forum, most notably the 2020 Twitter account hijacking.

Incidents
The site has been linked to various SIM swap scams, where discussion took place on identity theft methods to change login information for online accounts.

Graham Ivan Clark, regarded as the "mastermind" behind the 2020 Twitter account hijacking, was a former member of the forum. Two participants, Mason Sheppard and Nima Fazeli, acted as brokers in selling of Twitter handles on the website.

In 2020, a man from Tennessee died from a heart attack from a swatting. An individual in the United Kingdom was attempting to coerce the man for an online username by ulitilizing tactics of the site, with him later being sentenced to five years in prison.

Security breaches
The website was hacked in May 2019, with the administrator of RaidForums uploading the database of the website for anyone to access. In December 2020, the website was hacked again with user data being stolen. In April 2021, the information of 350,000 members of the forum was breached.

Reception
Brian Krebs, an American journalist and investigative reporter known for the coverage of cybercriminals, has described the forum as a place "overrun with shady characters who are there mainly to rip off other members." In his report, he described how Facebook, Instagram, TikTok, and Twitter have took steps to crack down on users of the forum involved in the trafficking of hijacked accounts. Facebook told Krebs that the forum uses various tactics, such as harassment, intimidation, hacking, coercion, extortion, sextortion, SIM swapping, and swatting.

See also

 Hack Forums
 RaidForums
 Nulled
 Kiwi Farms

References

Crime forums
Internet forums